The  ( in Spanish) is the national costume for men in Venezuela. It has its origin in the Llanos of Venezuela.

It is traditionally white, beige, cream or ecru, although it is available in other colors. Recently,  have been worn by famous personalities in Venezuela for their weddings, in a renaissance of traditional dress – for example, Venezuelan folk musician Simón Díaz was known to almost always wear one.
The  is traditionally made of linen or cotton cloth, although gabardine and wool can be used. The outfit is made up of a pair of full-length trousers and a jacket. The jacket is fastened by five or six buttons, and may or may not have pockets (if so, no more than four). Overall, the outfit is very simple with clean, elegant lines.

References

National symbols of Venezuela
Venezuelan clothing
Colombian clothing
Folk costumes